Nuradilovo is a rural locality (a selo) in Khasavyurtovsky District, Republic of Dagestan, Russia. The population was 3,963 as of 2010. There are 40 streets.

Geography 
Nuradilovo is located 17 km northwest of Khasavyurt (the district's administrative centre) by road. Khamavyurt is the nearest rural locality.

References 

Rural localities in Khasavyurtovsky District